Valentina Aleksandrovna Sperantova  (1904 —  1978) was a    Soviet actress of theater and cinema. People's Artist of the USSR (1970). Member of the CPSU since 1953.

Biography
Valentina Sperantova was born on February 24, 1904, in Zaraysk (now Moscow Oblast). She had a large family headed by her father Aleksandr Dmitryevich Sperantov, secretary of the district congress. She first went on stage in her hometown of Zaraysk in an amateur theatre under the guidance of the famous sculptor Anna Golubkina.

Received in Vkhutemas, but did not study there for long. In 1925 she graduated from GITIS. Since 1925, the actress of the First State Pedagogical Theater (now Moscow Youth Theater).

She took part in the scoring of cartoons at the Soyuzmultfilm Studio.  In the cinema, since 1953, she has played 25 roles.

Selected filmography
 Alyosha Ptitsyn Grows Up (1953) as Grandmother Sima
 The Enchanted Boy (1955) as Nils (voice)
 The Humpbacked Horse (1958) as Ivan (voice)
 It Was I Who Drew the Little Man (1960) as Fedya Zaytsev (voice)
 A Noisy Day (1960) as Klavdiya Vasilevna Savina
 Most, Most, Most, Most (1966) as Adolescent Lion (voice)
 Two Comrades Were Serving (1968) as episode (uncredited)
 Funny Magic  (1969) as Akulina Ivanovna / Baba Yaga
 Big School-Break (1972) as  Glasha

Awards
 Honored Artist of the RSFSR (1946) 
 People's Artist of the RSFSR (1950) 
 People's Artist of the USSR (1970)

References

External links
 
Сложная жизнь Валентины Сперантовой, и её «Большие перемены»
 

1904 births
1978 deaths
Soviet stage actresses
Soviet film actresses
Soviet voice actresses
People's Artists of the USSR
People's Artists of the RSFSR
Honored Artists of the RSFSR
Communist Party of the Soviet Union members
Russian Academy of Theatre Arts alumni
Burials at Novodevichy Cemetery